Domenico Marchiori (Lendinara, Province of Rovigo; 1828 – 1905) was an Italian painter. He was attracted to Neo-Pompeian subject matter.

Biography
Marchiori studied mathematics at the University of Padua, and came late to painting. He was also active as a parliamentarian (1878-1880), in addition to a dilettante poet. He studied in Rome at the Accademia del Nudo.

In 1881 at Milan, he exhibited a canvas depicting a Priest of the Ancient Bacchus. In 1884 at Turin, he displayed a portrait in watercolor. In 1887 at Venice, he exhibited a watercolor titled: Dal triclinio al cubicolo, and a canvas Aspettilo anca ti.

He also painted frescoes for the Palazzo Marchiori in Lendinara, portraits, and an altarpiece for the church in Cavazzana, Rovigo.

References

19th-century Italian painters
Italian male painters
20th-century Italian painters
1828 births
1905 deaths
Neo-Pompeian painters
People from the Province of Rovigo
19th-century Italian male artists
20th-century Italian male artists